Utetheisa specularis is a moth in the family Erebidae. It was described by Francis Walker in 1856. It is found in Indonesia.

Subspecies
Utetheisa specularis specularis (Walker, 1856) (Sulawesi, Moluccas, Seram, Flores, Amboina)
Utetheisa specularis extendens de Vos, 2007 (Banggai Islands, Halmaheira, Obi)
Utetheisa specularis oroya (Swinhoe, 1903) (Sula Islands, Moluccas, New Guinea)

References

Moths described in 1856
specularis